Kabange Twite (born 4 April 1984) is a retired Congolese-Rwandan football striker, who last played for AS Kigali.

Personal life 
Kabange is twin brother of Rwanda national player Eric Gasana.

References 

1984 births
Living people
Democratic Republic of the Congo footballers
Democratic Republic of the Congo international footballers
Association football forwards
Democratic Republic of the Congo expatriate footballers
Expatriate footballers in Rwanda
Democratic Republic of the Congo expatriate sportspeople in Rwanda
FC Saint-Éloi Lupopo players
APR F.C. players
Rayon Sports F.C. players
21st-century Democratic Republic of the Congo people